John George Brown (10 October 1839 – 18 July 1916), better known as "Kootenai" Brown, was an Irish-born Canadian polymath, soldier, trader and conservation advocate.

Early life
John George Brown was born and educated in Ennistymon, County Clare, Ireland.  Brown was commissioned as a British Army officer in 1857 "without purchase" (a reference to the practise then common of wealthy Britons purchasing officers' commissions), joining the 8th Regiment as an ensign. After serving in India from 1858 to 1859, in 1862 he sold his commission and joined the flood of prospectors joining the Cariboo Gold Rush in British Columbia, Canada.

Frontiersman
He proved unsuccessful as a prospector, turning to trapping and then briefly policing, serving as constable in Wild Horse Creek, British Columbia (now gone).

In 1865, he moved on, to Waterton Lakes , being wounded by a Blackfoot on his way to Fort Garry (now Winnipeg), where he settled and became a whisky trader.

Subsequent to that, he worked briefly for a company delivering mail to the United States Army until 1874, during which time he was captured and nearly killed by Sitting Bull in 1869.

After a quarrel (and obligatory gunfight) at Fort Benton, Montana, with "celebrated hunter" Louis Ell, in which Ell was killed, and subsequent trial and acquittal by a territorial jury, Brown returned to his beloved Kootenay, where he settled, building a reputation as a guide and packer.

In the North West Rebellion, he acted as chief scout to the Rocky Mountain Rangers.

Always arguing vigorously for the region's preservation, after the Kootenay Forest Reserve was established in 1895, Brown became a fishery officer and in 1910, a forest ranger.

He lived to see the reserve expanded into Waterton Lakes National Park, which became contiguous with Glacier National Park in Montana, in 1914.

Later life
In 1869, Kootenay Brown married a local Metis woman and ultimately made a living bison hunting and wolfing.

Kootenay Brown died in Waterton Lakes, Alberta, Canada and was buried alongside his two wives.

In popular culture
The 1991 movie The Legend of Kootenai Brown starring Tom Burlinson, Raymond Burr and Donnelly Rhodes, provides a loose portrayal of his life.

The Kootenai Brown Pioneer Village in Pincher Creek, Alberta, is named after Kootenai Brown for his contribution to the history of the surrounding area. Kootenai Brown's cabin is also located on site.

References

Notes

Sources

 http://www.biographi.ca/en/bio/brown_john_george_14E.html

Further reading 
 

Founders of the petroleum industry
1839 births
1916 deaths
Canadian gold prospectors
King's Regiment (Liverpool) officers
People from County Clare
People of the North-West Rebellion
Irish emigrants to pre-Confederation Canada
Colony of British Columbia (1858–1866) people
History of Montana
Pre-Confederation Alberta people
Pre-Confederation Manitoba people
Canadian company founders
Canadian fur traders
Persons of National Historic Significance (Canada)
Mountain men
Hudson's Bay Company people
People of the American Old West
Cowboys